Ponhook Lake 10 is a Mi'kmaq reserve located in Queens County, Nova Scotia. The population was 10 in 2011.
As of Oct 31st 2022 population 15.

It is administratively part of the Acadia First Nation.

Indian reserves in Nova Scotia
Communities in Queens County, Nova Scotia
Mi'kmaq in Canada